The Thundering West, also known as Trail of the Tumbleweed,  is a 1939 American Western film directed by Sam Nelson, starring Charles Starrett, and Iris Meredith.

Cast
 Charles Starrett as Jim Dale
 Iris Meredith as Helen Patterson
 Dick Curtis as Wolf Munro
 Hank Bell as Tucson
 Edward J. Le Saint as Judge Patterson
 Hal Taliaferro as Frank Kendall
 Bob Nolan as Bob
 Sons of the Pioneers
 Robert Fiske as Harper
 Edmund Cobb as Dagger
 Art Mix as Kirk

References

1939 films
1939 Western (genre) films
American black-and-white films
American Western (genre) films
Films directed by Sam Nelson
Columbia Pictures films
1930s English-language films
1930s American films